The Sri Lanka women's cricket team played the South Africa women's cricket team in February 2019. The tour consisted of three Women's One Day Internationals (WODIs), which formed part of the 2017–20 ICC Women's Championship, and three Women's Twenty20 International (WT20I) matches. South Africa Women won the WT20I series 3–0. South Africa Women's captain Dane van Niekerk was ruled out of the last two WODI matches due to an injury, with Suné Luus leading the team in her place. South Africa Women also won the WODI series 3–0.

Squads

Ahead of the WT20I matches, Chloe Tryon was ruled out of South Africa's squad due to an injury, and was replaced by Suné Luus. Lizelle Lee was withdrawn from the tour, due to fitness standards, and was replaced by Andrie Steyn in South Africa's team. Zintle Mali was also ruled out of South Africa's T20I squad due to injury. Suné Luus and Nadine de Klerk were added to South Africa's WODI squad, replacing Lizelle Lee and Chloe Tryon.

WT20I series

1st WT20I

2nd WT20I

3rd WT20I

Tour match

50 over match: North West Women vs Sri Lanka Women

WODI series

1st WODI

2nd WODI

3rd WODI

Notes

References

External links
 Series home at ESPN Cricinfo

2019 in women's cricket
2017–20 ICC Women's Championship
2019 in South African cricket
2019 in Sri Lankan cricket
International cricket competitions in 2018–19
South Africa 2018-19
Sri Lanka 2018-19